Louis Vivin (born 28 July 1861, Hadol, France; died 28 May 1936 in Paris) was a French primitivist painter.

Biography
Vivin was born in Hadol, France. He showed great enthusiasm for painting as a child, but his career took him in a completely different direction: he worked as a postal clerk until 1922, pursuing his art only in his spare time. Once he retired in 1923, Vivin finally took up the full-time part of being an artist.  He moved to Paris in 1889 where he lived with his wife in the district of Montparnasse.

He was a self-taught and a representative of naïve painting. Eventually, he was discovered by the German art critic Wilhelm Uhde (1874–1947), an association which helped him start exhibiting and build a reputation as a serious artist.

Works
The subjects of Vivin's paintings were still life, hunting subjects, and the city of Paris. Vivin was a contemporary of Henri Rousseau, Camille Bombois, André Bauchant, and Séraphine Louis, known collectively as the "Sacred Heart Painters" and as masters of French naïve painting. Vivin's works are known to have a sad and dismal theme to them. He was also known for painting from his memory. Louis Vivin was influenced by the work and details of Jean-Louis-Ernest Meissonier’s paintings. His works depicted genre scenes, flower pieces, hunting scenes and views of Paris, "notable for their charmingly wobbly perspective effects".

Louis Vivin’s first one-man exhibition was placed at the Galerie des Quatre Chemins, and it was organized by Wilhelm Uhde in 1927. His later work was considered to become less dependent of the melancholy mood, and it focused more on blocks of color and form.

Lists of his selected artworks
Southampton City Art Gallery
 Venice: Canal Scene with a Church
 La main chaude
 Les Invalides
 Venice: Canal Scene with a Bridge

Auction Christie's
 La place des Halles et l'eglise Saint-eustache, Paris, 1935
 Sacre coeur
 Vue de sacre coeur

Private collections
 Casino de Biarritz
 The Flower Market, 1914
 Gare Montparnasse, Paris
 Luncheon on the Grass, 1925
 Paris, Eglise de la Trinité, 1925
 Paris, Montmartre: Cirque Medrano, 1925

References

1861 births
1936 deaths
19th-century French painters
French male painters
20th-century French painters
20th-century French male artists
Post-impressionist painters
Naïve painters
Burials at Père Lachaise Cemetery
19th-century French male artists